At the 1900 Summer Olympics, a Basque pelota tournament was contested.

Only two teams entered, from Spain and France, but the French team, which included Maurice Durquetty and Etchegaray, withdrew before the competition: therefore, the tournament was scratched and the Spanish team were awarded first prize.

This is the only Olympics to date where pelota was an official sport, being revived at the 1924, 1968 and 1992 Games as a demonstration sport.

Medalists

References

 International Olympic Committee medal winners database
 De Wael, Herman. Herman's Full Olympians: "Pelota 1900". Accessed 25 February 2006.
 

1900 Summer Olympics events
1900
Olympics
1900 in basque pelota
Men's events at the 1900 Summer Olympics